Eel River Brewing Company is a brewery in Fortuna, California and the first certified organic brewery in the United States.

History
The Eel River Brewing Company was established in 1994 in Fortuna on the site of the Eel River Brewing Taproom and Grill; both are owned and operated by Margaret Frigon and Ted Vivatson. The brewpub was built on the historic site of the Clay Brown Redwood Mill. The establishment, with its 100+ seating, also offers the largest beer garden on California's North Coast complete with a horseshoe pit.

Eel River Brewing made all its beer from 1994 at the brewpub until the move to Scotia in 2007.  Since then only small batches of beer are produced at Eel River Brewing Fortuna although it continues to be a top dining destination in the county, with all of Eel River Brewing's beers on tap as well as specialty brews that can be found only there.  The menu boasts a wide range of food from stout-smoked BBQ to salads, sandwiches to seafood featuring local and organic Humboldt County products.

In 1999, they became one of the first certified organic brewery in the United States; their Amber Ale was the first beer made with that certification.

In 2007, Eel River Brewing outgrew the original brewing facility and moved to an old redwood mill in Scotia.  In 2009 after only two years at the new brewing facility, Eel River Brewing nearly doubled what they were producing previously at the old site.  With production in 2009 of over 7,000 barrels, Eel River Brewing currently distributes to more than half of the states in the U.S. as well as Canada, Mexico and Brazil.

Sustainability 
Besides being the first certified-organic brewery in the U.S., the brewing facility is powered by 100% bio-mass renewable energy and has its own wastewater pretreatment facility on location which filters the waste, easing the strain that would otherwise be put on the municipal water treatment plant. Spent grain from the brewing process is used to feed Eel River Brewing’s local, organic cattle that are in turn sold as organic beef at the Eel River Brewing Company Taproom and Grill in Fortuna.  Packaging and promotional items are made from recycled materials and Eel River Brewing buys these items locally to minimize the effects of transportation.  The Eel River Brewing tap handles are made from reclaimed wood and all paper packaging is made with recycled materials and printed with soy-based inks.

Awards 
Eel River Brewing has earned nearly 200 national and state awards, including gold and silver medals from the Great American Beer Festival and the California State Fair, as well as Best of Show at the Humboldt County Fair.

See also

 California breweries

References

Beer brewing companies based in Humboldt County, California
Fortuna, California
1994 establishments in California